Interstate 755 can refer to either of the following proposed roads:
Airport Parkway (Mississippi) a proposed connector between I-55 and the airport in Jackson
Interstate 755 (Missouri), a canceled freeway in St. Louis

7
55-7